Ptarmigan Peak is a peak located beside Pika Peak in Banff National Park, Alberta, Canada.

The mountain was named in 1909 by J.W.A. Hickson after he found several ptarmigan in the meadows below the peak. Hickson also made the first ascent guided by Edward Feuz jr.

The Lake Louise Mountain Resort is developed on the southern slopes of the Merlin Ridge, which includes Mount Richardson, Ptarmigan Peak, Pika Peak. A backcountry campground is located at the foot of the mountain, near Hidden Lake.

Routes 
The scrambling route is via southern slopes starting from Hidden Lake.

Geology

Like other mountains in Banff Park, the mountain is composed of sedimentary rock laid down during the Precambrian to Jurassic periods. Formed in shallow seas, this sedimentary rock was pushed east and over the top of younger rock during the Laramide orogeny.

Climate
Based on the Köppen climate classification, Ptarmigan Peak is located in a subarctic climate zone with cold, snowy winters, and mild summers.

See also
Geography of Alberta

References

External links
 National Park Service web site: Banff National Park

Three-thousanders of Alberta
Mountains of Banff National Park